is a Japanese publishing company known for publishing and releasing books, magazines, light novels, games, and collectibles. Founded in 1969, the company owns and distributes such publications as the eponymous Hobby Japan magazine, as well as Uchusen. The company has also released a number of role-playing and tabletop games, action figures related to anime and manga franchises, as well as diecast cars and related models.

Role-playing games 
 Dungeons & Dragons 3rd, 3.5 and 4th edition (translated)
 Warhammer Fantasy Roleplay 2nd edition (translated)
 Ring Master I: The Shadow of Filias - Filias Nogisu no Anun (Sharp X68000, 1989)
 Ring Master II: Forget You Not, Evermore - Eien Naru Omoi (Sharp X68000, 1990)

Game books 
 Queen's Blade
 Fighting Fantasy (translated)

Anime 
 Aesthetica of a Rogue Hero
 Demon King Daimao
 Hell Girl
 Hyakka Ryōran Samurai Girls
 Invaders of the Rokujyōma!?
 Infinite Dendrogram
 Queen's Blade
 Seirei Gensouki: Spirit Chronicles
 Seven Mortal Sins
 The Master of Ragnarok & Blesser of Einherjar

Light novels 
 HJ Bunko
 HJ Novels

Other 
 Bikini Warriors

See also 
 Charano!
 List of game manufacturers

References

External links
 Official website 

1969 establishments in Japan
Monthly magazines published in Japan
Japanese role-playing games
Magazines established in 1969
Manufacturing companies of Japan
Mass media companies of Japan
Magazine publishing companies of Japan
Book publishing companies of Japan